Reet Roos (born 1 April 1973 in Taebla) is an Estonian politician. She has been member of X and XII Riigikogu.

She is a member of Pro Patria and Res Publica Union.

References

Living people
1973 births
Isamaa politicians
Women members of the Riigikogu
Members of the Riigikogu, 2003–2007
Members of the Riigikogu, 2011–2015
University of Tartu alumni
Tallinn University alumni
People from Lääne-Nigula Parish
21st-century Estonian women politicians